Malmedal Lake is a lake in Pope County, in the U.S. state of Minnesota.

Malmedal Lake was named for Christian Malmedard, a Norwegian settler.

See also
List of lakes in Minnesota

References

Lakes of Minnesota
Lakes of Pope County, Minnesota